Agho may refer to:

 Nelson Agho, English professional footballer
 Agho Obaseki, paramount Chief in the Benin Empire from 1898 to 1914
 Agho Island, a small, mostly uninhabited island in northeastern Iloilo, Philippines

See also 
 Aghora (disambiguation)